The 2016 Maldives FA Cup is the 28th edition of the Maldives FA Cup. It is being continued after a one-year break.

Qualifying rounds

Round one

Round two

Round three

Qualifying play-offs

Quarter finals

Semi finals

Third place match

Final

References
 FA Cup 2016 - Maldives at RSSSF

External links
 Maldives FA Cup Official page at Facebook

Maldives FA Cup seasons
FA Cup